Gabriel Company Bauzá, mostly known as Biel Company (born 23 November 1963), is a Spanish politician and President of the People's Party of the Balearic Islands since March 2017. He served as Minister of Agriculture, Environment and Territory of the Balearic Islands in the Bauzá government from 2011 to 2015, his first political role.

References 

1963 births
Living people
People's Party (Spain) politicians
Members of the Parliament of the Balearic Islands